Pavel Secrier (born 11 January 1991) is a Moldovan footballer who plays as a midfielder.

References

External links

Living people
1991 births
Footballers from Chișinău
Moldovan footballers
Association football midfielders
Moldovan expatriate footballers
Expatriate footballers in Belarus
Expatriate footballers in Romania
FC Dacia Chișinău players
FC Sfîntul Gheorghe players
FC Academia Chișinău players
Speranța Nisporeni players
FC Granit Mikashevichi players
FC Zimbru Chișinău players
Liga II players
ACS Foresta Suceava players